Girdwood station is a Via Rail flag stop station located in Girdwood, Ontario on the Sudbury – White River train.

References

External links
Via Rail page for Girdwood train station

Via Rail stations in Ontario
Railway stations in Algoma District